Bohutín is a municipality and village in Šumperk District in the Olomouc Region of the Czech Republic. It has about 700 inhabitants.

History
The first written mention of Bohutín is from 1371.

References

Villages in Šumperk District